The 2018 NACAM Rally Championship was the eleventh season of the NACAM Rally Championship. This championship was the FIA regional rally championship for the North America and Central America (NACAM) region. The season began 8 March in Leon, Mexico, and ended 23 November in Colima, Mexico, after four events held in Canada and Mexico.

Venezuela's Rally Isla de Margarita was dropped without replacement from the calendar leaving only the mid-year Canadian Rallye Baie-des-Chaleurs event held outside of Mexico.

Defending champion, Citroën driver Ricardo Triviño won his ninth NACAM championship. Triviño won the first three rounds of the championship, wrapping the championship up after the mid-year trip to Canada. Fellow Mexican, Mitsubishi driver Ricardo Cordero Jr. finished second in the points after winning the season ending Rally Colima. Colombian Subaru driver Julián Jaramillo was third in the championship after good placings in the first two rallies of the championship.

Event calendar and results

The 2018 NACAM Rally Championship was as follows:

Championship standings
The 2018 NACAM Rally Championship points are as follows:

References

External links

NACAM Rally Championship
NACAM
NACAM Rally Championship